Real-time Analog Signal Processing (R-ASP), as an alternative to DSP-based processing, might be defined as the manipulation of signals in their pristine analog form and in real time to realize specific operations enabling microwave or millimeter-wave and terahertz applications.

The exploding demand for higher spectral efficiency in radio has spurred a renewed interest in analog real-time components and systems beyond conventional purely digital signal processing techniques. Although they are unrivaled at low microwave frequencies, due to their high flexibility, compact size, low cost and strong reliability, digital devices suffer of major issues, such as poor performance, high cost of A/D and D/A converters and excessive power consumption, at higher microwave and millimeter-wave frequencies. At such frequencies, analog devices and related real-time or analog signal processing (ASP) systems, which manipulate broadband signals in the time domain, may be far preferable, as they offer the benefits of lower complexity and higher speed, which may offer unprecedented solutions in the major areas of radio engineering, including communications, but also radars, sensors, instrumentation and imaging. This new technology might be seen as microwave and millimeter-wave counterpart of ultra-fast optics signal processing, and has been recently enabled by a wide range of novel phasers, that are components following arbitrary group delay versus frequency responses.

References

Signal processing
Microwave technology